The Țibleș is a right tributary of the river Someșul Mare in Romania. Its source is in the Țibleș Mountains. It discharges into the Someșul Mare in Mocod.

References

Rivers of Romania
Rivers of Bistrița-Năsăud County